Sugar Hill is an unincorporated community in Jefferson County, in the U.S. state of Pennsylvania.

History
A post office was established at Sugar Hill in 1877, and remained in operation until 1908.

References

Unincorporated communities in Jefferson County, Pennsylvania
Unincorporated communities in Pennsylvania